Cyphogastra javanica is a Jewel Beetle of the Buprestidae family.

Description
The basic colour of the elytra is metallic dark blue, while the thorax and the head are metallic reddish.

Distribution
This species occurs in Indonesia.

References

Buprestidae
javanica
Beetles described in 1871
Taxa named by Edward Saunders (entomologist)